Ponvayal is a 1954 Indian Tamil-language film written and directed by A. T. Krishnaswamy, and produced by T. R. Ramachandran. It is based on the story Poimaan Karadu by Kalki Krishnamurthy that was serialised in the weekly magazine Kalki. The film stars T. R. Ramachandran and Anjali Devi. It was released on 12 February 1954 and failed commercially. The film is lost.

Plot 

Sengodan owns 10 acres of land, known as "Ponvayal" (Golden Farm). It is rumoured that fortune in gold is buried in Ponvayal. Sengodan loves his cousin Semba. Esraj, a counterfeiter, plans to obtain at the fortune. He seeks the help of a graduate Bangaru and his lover. Unknown to Esraj, a policeman and an actress work against him and the crafty couple succeed in foiling the plans of Esraj. Sengodan is later arrested on a charge of attempting to murder Bangaru, but the policeman, with help from his girlfriend, discovers the truth and Sengodan is exonerated.

Cast 
 T. R. Ramachandran as Sengodan
 Anjali Devi as Semba
 Manohar as Bangaru
 Mynavathi as Bangaru's lover
 K. Sarangapani as the policeman
 K. A. Thangavelu as Esraj

Production 
Poimaan Karadu was a novel written by Kalki Krishnamurthy and serialised in his own magazine Kalki. When the film rights to this story were bought, the film adaptation was titled Ponvayal. It was directed and written by A. T. Krishnaswamy, and produced by T. R. Ramachandran (who also played the male lead) under Jayanthi Pictures. It is the company's first production.

Soundtrack 
The music of the film was composed by Thuraiyur Rajagopal Sarma and R. Rajagopal, under the supervision of N. P. Abdul Khader. The lyrics were written by Yogi Suddhanantha Bharathiyar and Sundara Vathiyar.

Release and reception 
Ponvayal was released on 12 February 1954, and distributed by Madras Pictures. The critic from The Indian Express positively reviewed the film for Krishnaswamy's writing and direction, along with the performances of Ramachandran, Anjali Devi and Muthulakshmi. Despite this, it failed at the box office. No print of the film is known to survive, making it a lost film.

References

External links 
 

1950s lost films
1950s Tamil-language films
1954 films
Adaptations of works by Kalki Krishnamurthy
Lost Indian films